The LeapFrog Didj is a handheld console made by LeapFrog Enterprises. The Didj was priced at $89.99 when it debuted on August 22, 2008. Its library mostly consists of educational software aimed for children based on licensed properties such as those from Disney, Nickelodeon, and Marvel.

The Didj runs on a customized Linux distribution with OpenGL, plus homebrew applications and demos.

Games

 Didji Racing: Tiki Tropics
 Foster's Home for Imaginary Friends
 Hannah Montana
 High School Musical
 Indiana Jones
 Jetpack Heroes
 Nancy Drew: Mystery in the Hollywood Hills
 Neopets: Quizara's Curse
 Nicktoons: Android Invasion
 Sonic the Hedgehog
 SpongeBob SquarePants: Fists of Foam
 Star Wars: Jedi Trials
  Star Wars: The Clone Wars
 Super Chicks
 Tinker Bell and the Lost Treasure
 Wolverine and the X-Men

References

External links

Children's educational video games
Educational toys
ARM-based video game consoles
Handheld game consoles
Linux-based video game consoles
Embedded Linux
Products introduced in 2008
Video games developed in the United States